Yurchi-ye Gharbi Rural District is in Kuraim District of Nir County, Ardabil province, Iran. At the census of 2006, its population was 3,882 in 914 households; there were 3,845 inhabitants in 1,105 households at the following census of 2011; and in the most recent census of 2016, the population of the rural district was 3,266 in 1,074 households. The largest of its 20 villages was Qarah Shiran, with 491 people.

References 

Nir County

Rural Districts of Ardabil Province

Populated places in Ardabil Province

Populated places in Nir County